Isaias Bardales Jr. (born August 18, 1979 in San Jose, California) is a former American soccer player.

Career

College
Bardales attended Leland High School in San Jose, California and played college soccer at San Jose State University.

Professional
Bardales signed a Project-40 contract with Major League Soccer and was drafted in the first round (11th overall) in the 2001 MLS SuperDraft by Los Angeles Galaxy. He played in 12 MLS games for Galaxy in his rookie season, starting one, and scored a goal in the US Open Cup. He was sent on loan to the Seattle Sounders and later the Syracuse Salty Dogs in the A-League, and was waived at the end of the 2003 season.

He later played in the USL Premier Development League for the San Diego Gauchos and the San Jose Frogs.

Post-Soccer Career
Bardales was a forward for the California Cougars of the Professional Arena Soccer League for a time. His coaching experience began with Aptos High School Boys Varsity Soccer in Santa Cruz, CA.  He later took on an Assistant Coach position for Evergreen Valley College in San Jose, California in 2008.

In 2010, he began training youth competitive soccer teams across the Bay Area, CA earning him a prestigious Bay Area Double-Goal Coach Award from Positive Coaching Alliance. As of 2021, Bardales continues to train youth competitive soccer in the Inland Empire, CA.

References

Living people
1979 births
Association football forwards
LA Galaxy players
Syracuse Salty Dogs players
San Diego Gauchos players
San Jose Frogs players
California Cougars players
USL League Two players
Major League Soccer players
American soccer players
American expatriate soccer players
San Jose State Spartans men's soccer players
Seattle Sounders (1994–2008) players
Puerto Rico Islanders players
A-League (1995–2004) players
USL First Division players
Expatriate footballers in Puerto Rico
Soccer players from California
LA Galaxy draft picks